The Governor of Balochistan is the head of the province of Balochistan, Pakistan. The post was established on 1 July 1970, after the dissolution of West Pakistan province and the end of One Unit. Under Pakistan's current parliamentary system, the governorship is a ceremonial position, as a symbol of the federation. The governor is appointed by the centre, whereas the principal head of the provincial government remains the elected Chief Minister of Balochistan. 

Despite this, Balochistan has seen several periods of martial law or governor's rule where, in the absence of a chief minister, the governor exercised broad powers. As of March 2023, [[Malik Abd-ul-Wali Kakar] is serving as acting governor after the resignation of Syed Zahoor Ahmad Agha on 04 March 2023. 

The first governor of the province was Riaz Hussain (1970–1971). The longest-serving governor was Rahimuddin Khan (1978–1984).

Periods of governor's rule

After the dissolution of One Unit in 1970, Balochistan attained the status of a full province, administered by its first governor, General Riaz Hussain, pending general elections, which were held the same year. The left-wing National Awami Party (NAP) secured the highest number of votes in the province, whereas the ruling party at the centre, the Pakistan People's Party (PPP) under Zulfikar Ali Bhutto, secured none. The NAP ministry was however dismissed by Bhutto in 1973, and its senior leaders were imprisoned. Bhutto imposed governor's rule under Akbar Bugti, and military operations against tribal insurgents commenced in 1973.

After the Bhutto regime was overthrown in a military coup by General Zia-ul-Haq in 1977, the NAP leaders were released and the Chief Justice of the Balochistan High Court, Khuda Bakhsh Marri, became governor; the other chief justices also became governors of their corresponding provinces. Marri was replaced by General Rahimuddin Khan, who announced a general amnesty, ending military action in the province.

Governor's rule returned under military ruler Pervez Musharraf, who dissolved the provincial government in 1999, and for a brief period under the fourth PPP ministry in 2013, culminating in the dismissal of the provincial government under Aslam Raisani amid rising sectarian violence.

Governor House
The seat of the Governor is located at Governor House, Quetta, constructed in 1888 during the British Raj. It was heavily damaged during the 1935 Quetta earthquake, but was repaired by the Viceroy of India, Lord Willingdon. 

The Governor House was opened to the public in 2018, by the Pakistan Tehreek-e-Insaf government.

List of governors of Balochistan

See also 
 Chief Minister of Balochistan
 Government of Balochistan
 List of Governors of Pakistan
 List of Chief Ministers in Pakistan

References

External links 
 Official website

Governors of Balochistan, Pakistan
Provincial political office-holders in Pakistan